Elosport Capão Bonito, or simply Elosport, was a Brazilian football team based in Capão Bonito, São Paulo. Founded in 1993, it played in Campeonato Paulista Segunda Divisão.

History
The club was founded on 10 May 1993, and professionalized its football department in 1997, after joining the Federação Paulista de Futebol.

Stadium
Elosport Capão Bonito play their home games at Estádio Doutor José Sidney Cunha. The stadium has a maximum capacity of 6,740 people.

References

Defunct football clubs in São Paulo (state)
Association football clubs established in 1993
Association football clubs disestablished in 2022
1993 establishments in Brazil
2022 disestablishments in Brazil